Dr. Henry Jekyll, nicknamed in some copies of the story as Harry Jekyll, and his alter ego, Mr. Edward Hyde, is the central character of Robert Louis Stevenson's 1886 novella Strange Case of Dr Jekyll and Mr Hyde. In the story, he is a good friend of main protagonist Gabriel John Utterson. Jekyll is a kind and respected English doctor who has repressed evil urges inside of him. In an attempt to hide this, he develops a type of serum that he believes will effectively compartmentalize his dark side. Instead, Jekyll transforms into Edward Hyde, the physical and mental manifestation of his evil personality. This process happens more regularly until Jekyll becomes unable to control when the transformations occur.

Fictional character biography
Doctor Henry Jekyll is a doctor who feels that he is battling between the benevolence and malevolence within himself. He spends his life trying to repress evil urges that are not fitting for a man of his stature. Jekyll develops a serum in an attempt to mask this hidden evil. However, in doing so, Jekyll transforms into a hideous creature, who appears a lot younger than he usually does. Jekyll decides to take advantage of this, naming this transformation of his "Edward Hyde", and uses his new persona to act out his hidden desires free of consequences while keeping his social status as Jekyll. As time goes by, Hyde grows in power and eventually manifests whenever Henry Jekyll shows signs of physical or moral weakness, no longer needing the serum to transform.

Stevenson never says exactly what Hyde does, generally saying that it is something of an evil and lustful nature. Thus, in the context of the times, it is abhorrent to Victorian religious morality. Hyde may have been reeling in activities such as engaging with prostitutes or buggery. However, it is Hyde's violent activities that seem to give him the most thrills, driving him to attack and murder Sir Danvers Carew without apparent reason, making him a hunted outlaw throughout England. Carew was a client of Gabriel Utterson, Jekyll's lawyer and friend, who is concerned by Hyde's history of violence and the fact that Jekyll changed his will, leaving everything to Hyde. Dr. Hastie Lanyon, a mutual acquaintance of Jekyll and Utterson, dies of shock after receiving information relating to Jekyll. Before his death, Lanyon gives Utterson a letter to be opened after Jekyll's death or disappearance.

When Jekyll refuses to leave his lab for weeks, Utterson and Jekyll's butler Mr. Poole break into the lab. Inside, they find the body of Hyde wearing Jekyll's clothes and apparently dead from suicide. They find also a letter from Jekyll to Utterson promising to explain the entire mystery. Utterson takes the document home where he first reads Lanyon's letter and then Jekyll's. The first reveals that Lanyon's deterioration and eventual death resulted from seeing Hyde drinking a serum or potion and subsequently turning into Jekyll. The second letter explains that Jekyll, having previously indulged unstated vices (and with it the fear that discovery would lead to his losing his social position), found a way to transform himself and thereby indulge his vices without fear of detection. But as Jekyll used Hyde to act out his desires more and more, he effectively became a sociopath — evil, self-indulgent, and utterly uncaring to anyone but himself. Initially, Jekyll was able to control the transformations, but then he became Hyde involuntarily in his sleep.

At this point, Jekyll resolved to cease becoming Hyde. One night however, the urge gripped him too strongly. After the transformation, he immediately rushed out and violently killed Carew. Horrified, Jekyll tried more adamantly to stop the transformations, as now his scapegoat was no longer safe. For a time, he proved successful by engaging in philanthropic work. One day at a park, he considered how good a person he had become as a result of his deeds (in comparison to others), believing himself redeemed. However, before he completed his line of thought, he looked down at his hands and realized that he had suddenly transformed once again into Hyde. This was the first time that an involuntary metamorphosis had happened in waking hours. Far from his laboratory and hunted by the police as a murderer, Hyde needed help to avoid being caught. He wrote to Lanyon (in Jekyll's hand) asking his friend to retrieve the contents of a cabinet in his laboratory and to meet him at midnight at Lanyon's home in Cavendish Square. In Lanyon's presence, Hyde mixed the potion and transformed back to Jekyll - ultimately leading to Lanyon's death. Meanwhile, Jekyll returned to his home only to find himself ever more helpless and trapped as the transformations increased in frequency and necessitated even larger doses of potion in order to reverse them.

Eventually, the stock of ingredients from which Jekyll had been preparing the potion ran low, and subsequent batches prepared by Dr. Jekyll from renewed stocks failed to produce the transformation. Jekyll speculated that the one essential ingredient that made the original potion work (a chemical salt) must have itself been contaminated. After sending Poole to one chemist after another to purchase the salt that was running low only to find it wouldn't work, he assumed that subsequent supplies all lacked the essential ingredient that made the potion successful for his experiments. His ability to change back from Hyde into Jekyll had slowly vanished in consequence. Jekyll wrote that even as he composed his letter, he knew that he would soon become Hyde permanently, having used the last of this salt and he wondered if Hyde would face execution for his crimes or choose to kill himself. Jekyll noted that in either case, the end of his letter marked the end of his life. He ended the letter saying "I bring the life of that unhappy Henry Jekyll to an end". With these words, both the document and the novella come to a close.

The original pronunciation of "Jekyll", as used in Stevenson's native Scotland, rhymed with "treacle", thus.

Adaptations

While there are adaptations of the book, the section depicts the different portrayals in different media appearances:

Television
 Dr. Jekyll appeared in some of Warner Bros.' Looney Tunes and Merrie Melodies animated shorts.
 Dr. Jerkyl's Hide (1954) features Sylvester turning into a Hyde-like cat upon ingesting the formula which he mistook for soda pop where he attacks Spike the Bulldog and Chester the Terrier.
 Hyde and Hare (1955) depicts Dr. Jekyll (voiced by Mel Blanc) bringing Bugs Bunny to his apartment. When Dr. Jekyll drinks his formula, he becomes Mr. Hyde who is depicted with green skin and red eyes. Toward the end of the short, Bugs Bunny drinks the formula and transforms into a Hyde-like rabbit.
 In Hyde and Go Tweet (1960), Dr. Jekyll drinks a formula that turns himself into Mr. Hyde. The commotion wakes Sylvester, who then sees Hyde revert to the form of Jekyll. Tweety later exposes himself to Dr. Jekyll's formula and he becomes a Hyde-like canary.
 Dr. Jekyll and Mr. Hyde appear in Climax! episode "The Strange Case of Dr Jekyll and Mr. Hyde". Hosted by Bill Lundigan, this episode was originally aired on 28 July 1955 (Season 1 Episode 34). The story was adapted for television by Gore Vidal.
 Loosely based on Stevenson's novel, the first season episode of Star Trek: The Original Series, The Enemy Within, Captain Kirk is split into two people, one evil and one good.
 The Scooby-Doo, Where are You! episode "Nowhere to Hyde" features the Ghost of Mr. Hyde (voiced by John Stephenson) who is committing jewelry store robberies and one of the suspects is a descendant of Dr. Jekyll.
 In the Dynomutt, Dog Wonder episode "Everyone Hyde!", the criminal Willie the Weasel (voiced by Henry Corden) creates a similar formula (which is related to Dr. Jekyll's formula) that turns him into Mr. Hyde.
 The grandson of Dr. Jekyll and Mr. Hyde are featured in The Comic Strip segment "Mini Monsters" voiced by Earl Hammond. He works as the camp physician at Camp Mini-Mon.
 In the Gravedale High episode "Fear of Flying", there is a medical version of Dr. Jekyll and Mr. Hyde (voiced by Frank Welker) that works as a doctor for the monsters. Mr. Hyde serves as Dr. Jekyll's "partner" where Dr. Jekyll would turn into him for any second opinions of anyone's medical problems.
 In the All Dogs Go to Heaven: The Series episode "Dr. Beagle and Mangy Hyde", Charlie turns into a Mr. Hyde-like monster (voiced by Brad Garrett) when eating dog food tainted with a dangerous substance Carface had.
 Dr. Jekyll and Mr. Hyde appear in the Animaniacs episode "Brain Meets Brawn", voiced by Jeff Bennett. Dr. Jekyll was seen taking a serum that turns him into Mr. Hyde who is then attacked by the police. They take a break in the conflict when tea time occurs. Afterwards, the police subdue Mr. Hyde and take him away to the police station. Dr. Jekyll's serum inspires Brain to take it so that he can break Big Ben in this monster form whenever he is angered.
 The 2004 TV series Power Rangers: Dino Thunder (American adaptation of Bakuryū Sentai Abaranger), Mesogog was based on a character but caused by an experiment with dinosaur DNA gone wrong.
 The 2007 TV serial Jekyll starred James Nesbitt as Tom Jackman, a modern Jekyll whose Hyde persona wreaks havoc in modern London. In the course of the series, it is revealed that the original Jekyll's transformation into Hyde was a 'natural' process, triggered by Jekyll's love for his maid rather than any kind of potion, and Jackman is the descendant of one of Hyde's bastard sons, while his wife is a clone of Jekyll's maid created by a corporation to try and duplicate the Hyde process. As with most modern adaptations, Hyde is depicted as possessing superhuman strength, able to tear a lion apart with his bare hands, and is depicted as being impulsive and childish rather than explicitly evil, although the physical changes are fairly subtle, such as Hyde having darker eyes and a different hairstyle. At the series' conclusion, Hyde apparently sacrifices himself to save Jackman, "dying" when he is shot but somehow able to stop Jackman "sharing the damage", with the result that the bullets remain in Jackman but he has no injuries to demonstrate where they entered his body.
 NBC's Do No Harm is a modern retelling of the Jekyll and Hyde story featuring a renamed Jekyll-like character named Dr. Jason Cole (played by Steven Pasquale) trying to stop his drug-addicted, sociopathic, Hyde-like counterpart named Ian Price from ruining his professional and private life. Unlike the original story, the main character is a highly respected neurosurgeon who is able to keep his alter-ego in check through the use of an experimental sedative. Also, Jason suffers from dissociative identity disorder instead of developing a serum that separates the good and evil in a person.
 The Phineas and Ferb episode "The Monster of Phineas-n-Ferbenstein" features the villain Dr. Jekyll Doofenshmirtz drinking a potion to turn himself into a monster.
 The Penn Zero: Part-Time Hero episode "Rip-Penn" features Penn as Dr. Barzelby (inspired by Dr. Jekyll), who accidentally drinks a potion that turns him into a monster version of Penn's nemesis Rippen during a mission to the Gothic Mystery World.
 SBS's Hyde, Jekyll, Me portrays a man, Goo Seo Jin, who is in line as a successor of the conglomerate group his family owns but has dissociative identity disorder. His other personality, Robin, is the opposite of his usual cold, cynical self; Robin is kind, gentle and has a savior complex.
 Shazad Latif portrays an Anglo-Indian Dr. Henry Jekyll on the third season of Penny Dreadful. In the show, Jekyll is the illegitimate child of an English nobleman and an Indian woman. His father abandoned Jekyll and his mother in India, and after Jekyll's mother dies from leprosy, he goes to the University of Cambridge, where he befriends Victor Frankenstein but is ultimately expelled from Cambridge after getting into a fight with a professor due to the professor's racist comments. He then works at Bedlam Hospital, developing a serum to pacify patients and bring out a calm, tame nature. In the last episode of the show, Jekyll's father dies and he inherits his title: Lord Hyde.
 The 2015 TV series Jekyll & Hyde focuses on the illegitimate grandson of Henry Jekyll named Doctor Robert Jekyll who has inherited his grandfather's Hyde personality. While Robert is initially able to control his transformation with pills, as the series unfolds, he learns about various demonic threats to the world, and is forced to harness the superhuman strength he possesses as Hyde to oppose these forces. In the course of the series, Robert Jekyll works with Henry Jekyll's old assistant and even meets Henry Jekyll's lover (and hence his grandmother), although his Hyde persona never gains a first name.
 Dr. Jekyll and Mr. Hyde appear in Once Upon a Time, with Dr. Jekyll portrayed by Hank Harris and Mr. Hyde portrayed by Sam Witwer. They first appear in the season five finale episodes "Only You" and "An Untold Story". Dr. Jekyll and Mr. Hyde are shown as inhabitants of the Land of Untold Stories, who follow the heroes to Storybrooke while emigrating the inhabitants of the Land of Untold Stories to Storybrooke as well. They originally came from the Victorian England world until Dr. Jekyll accidentally killed their love interest. In season six, Mr. Hyde strikes up an allegiance with Regina Mills' Evil Queen side. It's revealed that Jekyll's serum failed to remove his capacity for evil and he is killed by Captain Hook which causes Hyde to die as well as a side effect of the serum.
 Dr Jekyll and Mr. Hyde appear in Mary Shelley's Frankenhole, as a minor character who only appears in a few episodes. In the show, he is depicted as a pharmacist in the village that Victor Frankenstein's castle overlooks. He constantly seeks the approval Frankenstein, who views Jekyll as nothing more than an annoyance. Jekyll rarely transforms into Mr. Hyde, though when he does, Hyde usually will only make stereotypical sexist comments towards female characters. Like the novel, Jekyll does not need the serum to transform into Hyde, as in one episode, Victor manages to get Jekyll to turn into Hyde by mocking him.
 Dr. Jekyll and Mr Hyde also appeared in the 2008 TV movie Dr. Jekyll and Mr Hyde. This movie takes place in modern times and the role of Henry Jekyll and Edward Hyde is played by actor Dougray Scott. In this version, Dr. Jekyll finds a rare Amazonian flower that is said to be able to separate the soul. Henry studies and uses it on himself only for him to transform into Hyde at inopportune times.

Film
 John Barrymore played Jekyll and Hyde in the 1920 silent movie adaptation of the novel. This is the earliest film based on the novella.
 Fredric March played Jekyll and Hyde in the 1931 film adaptation of the novel, for which he won the Academy Award for Best Actor.
 Spencer Tracy played Jekyll and Hyde in the 1941 film adaptation of the novel.
 Louis Hayward played Jekyll and Hyde in The Son of Dr. Jekyll.
 Dr. Jekyll and Mr. Hyde appear as the antagonists in the 1953 short film Spooks! starring The Three Stooges. Here, the duo are two separate characters. This Dr. Jekyll is a mad scientist who kidnaps a beautiful woman to transplant her brain with that of a gorilla while Mr. Hyde is his assistant. Dr. Jekyll was portrayed by Philip Van Zandt while Mr. Hyde was portrayed by Tom Kennedy.
 Dr. Jekyll and Mr. Hyde appear in Abbott and Costello Meet Dr. Jekyll and Mr. Hyde (1953), played by Boris Karloff and Eddie Parker respectively .
 Jack Palance played the two characters in the 1968 TV movie.
 David Hemmings played the characters in the 1980 version, but instead of transforming into a hideous being, he becomes younger and very physically attractive. And even though he still does evil things, he seems to be more of a gentlemen at times and less remorseless than other versions of this character. The movie was only made for TV.
 Mark Blankfield played Jekyll and Hyde in the 1982 comedy Jekyll and Hyde... Together Again, wherein Jekyll discovers a white powder that unleashes the animal in every man and in his case transforming him from a shy and timid doctor into Hyde, a sex-crazed party animal.
 John Hannah played Jekyll and Hyde in the 2003 television film adaptation of the novel.
 In the Hammer Horror film Dr. Jekyll and Sister Hyde, Dr. Jekyll (Ralph Bates), rather than transforming into an deformed monster, transforms into a beautiful yet malicious femme fatale (Martine Beswick), his goal in this instance being to find a means of extending life rather than dividing man's good and evil natures from each other.
 Dr. Jekyll and Mr. Hyde appear in Mad Monster Party?, voiced by Allen Swift. Dr. Jekyll and Mr. Hyde appear as guests at a party thrown by Baron Boris von Frankenstein at his castle on the Isle of Evil. Dr. Jekyll keeps his elixir in his cane whenever he wants to turn into Mr. Hyde. Also, Dr. Jekyll's cane doubles as an umbrella as seen when Mr. Hyde uses it to keep the sleeping Creature from spewing water onto him at night.
 Dr. Jekyll and Mr. Hyde appear in Mad, Mad, Mad Monsters (a "prequel of sorts" to Mad Monster Party?), voiced again by Allen Swift. Dr. Jekyll appears as a therapist that the mail carrier Harvey visits after delivering the invitations to the wedding of the Monster and his bride at the Transylvania Astoria Hotel. At the end of the film, Harvey visits Dr. Jekyll again. This time, Dr. Jekyll drinks his serum and becomes Mr. Hyde. As the credits roll, Harvey is chased by Mr. Hyde who is joined by the other monsters. The bellhop Norman joins the chase in order to get Mr. Hyde's autograph.
 Mr. Hyde appears in The Nightmare Before Christmas, voiced by Randy Crenshaw. He appears as one of the citizens of Halloween Town. Only seen in his "Hyde" form, he keeps two smaller versions of himself underneath his hat.
 Dr. Jekyll and Mr. Hyde appear in the 1994 film The Pagemaster, voiced by Leonard Nimoy. Richard, Adventure, Fantasy, and Horror encounter Dr. Jekyll in the horror section of the Written World. He transforms into Mr. Hyde during the encounter and attacks the group. Fantasy was able to break the chandelier that fell onto Mr. Hyde and sent him falling through the floor. When Richard encounters the Pagemaster again, Dr. Jekyll is among the book characters that appear in the magical twister to congratulate him.
 Dr. Jekyll and Mr. Hyde appear in the 1996 film Mary Reilly, portrayed by John Malkovich.
 The film The League of Extraordinary Gentlemen (adapted from the comic book series) features Jason Flemyng as both Dr. Jekyll and Mr. Hyde (the latter using prosthetic makeup to appear as a Hulk-esque version of the character with superhuman strength). Dr. Jekyll and Mr. Hyde are employed by The League of Extraordinary Gentlemen to combat the ruthless criminal known as the Fantom, who is revealed in the course of the film to be "M", the man who recruited them, and also Professor Moriarty, who intends to acquire the power of the League for use in his plans to trigger a world war and sell his weapons for profit. His mole in the League, Dorian Gray, manages to acquire a sample of the Hyde serum, which he is able to duplicate, one of Moriarty's men drinking a massive overdose of the Hyde serum to become an even larger version of Hyde. Despite the other Hyde's size and raw power, he is defeated when he burns through the formula at an accelerated rate, resulting in Moriarty's fortress collapsing on top of him.
 Dr. Jekyll and Mr. Hyde appear in Van Helsing, with Dr. Jekyll portrayed by Stephen Fisher while Robbie Coltrane provides the voice of the CGI animated Mr. Hyde. Like the version that was seen in The League of Extraordinary Gentlemen, Mr. Hyde is also portrayed as a large, hulking brute. Van Helsing has pursued Hyde to Paris after having failed to capture him in an earlier confrontation in London, England. He is superhumanly strong and displays agility comparable to that of a great ape. While not invulnerable, he's extremely tough and sustains severe injuries that ultimately do little to impede or slow him down to any appreciable degree. Upon exchanging banter, they begin fighting in the bell tower of Notre Dame Cathedral with Van Helsing initially gaining the advantage by severing Hyde's left arm at the biceps, which regresses to a normal form after landing on the floor. Hyde rallies and assaults Van Helsing, using his right arm to hurl him through the roof of the cathedral. He then gloats before tossing Van Helsing off the roof only for Van Helsing to fire a grappling gun that sends the hook & line through the center of Hyde's body, which Van Helsing uses to stop his fall. He attempts to pull Hyde off the roof, only for Hyde to begin pulling him upward, seemingly unfazed by the large hole in his body. Hyde trips over the edge of the roof, his falling weight pulling Van Helsing up to the roof before the line breaks. As it breaks, the momentum swings Hyde through the Rose Window of the cathedral and, while he falls, Hyde transforms back into the form of Henry Jekyll and dies from the fall. A police officer spots Van Helsing on top of the cathedral and holds him accountable for Dr. Jekyll's death.
 The novelization of the film portrays Hyde as not only a murderer, but a cannibal as well. The novel says the body of the murdered woman Van Helsing discovers on the streets of Paris as partially devoured while the same scene in the film shows the woman's body intact. However, the film does suggest that Hyde is cannibalistic when he encounters Van Helsing in Notre Dame and tells him "You're a big one. You'll be hard to digest." In the Game Version Hyde tells Van Helsing that he is responsible for the murders and digestion of several people including children.
 The Ghost of Mr. Hyde made a cameo in Scooby-Doo! and the Goblin King as a patron in a monster bar.
 The Dynomutt version of Mr. Hyde appeared in Scooby-Doo! Mask of the Blue Falcon, voiced by John DiMaggio.
 Russell Crowe played Dr. Jekyll in The Mummy, which is the first and only installment in Universal's Dark Universe and is a role which would have been elaborated on in further films within the series. It is suggested that Jekyll's transformation into Hyde was a "natural" condition, as he reflects on how someone- implied to be him- realized that he was succumbing to evil but was able to find a cure as a physician, requiring regular injections of an unspecified compound to prevent himself becoming Hyde, an aggressive and sadistic persona. Despite the personality transformation, Dr. Jekyll and Mr. Hyde have the same appearance with the exception of their skin and eyes, although they also have a different palmprint with the result that palm scanners that will allow Jekyll access will prohibit Hyde from using the same door. As Hyde, he exhibits greater levels of physical strength, endurance and aggression as well as improved combat abilities.
 Henry Jekyll, better known as Edward "Eddy" Hyde, was mentioned many times in the 2022 live action film on Monster High. After he was expelled from Monster High because of his human half, Eddie Hyde worked on a formula to make him more monstrous. Unfortunately, he never got around to using it due to the fact that he was killed by the monster hunters. Eddy Hyde was revealed to have a son named Edward "Eddy" Hyde Jr. who went under the alias Mr. Komos and sought out his father's work.

Comics
 In The League of Extraordinary Gentlemen, Volume One and Volume Two by Alan Moore and Kevin O'Neill, Henry Jekyll is a scientist who is the lesser half of Edward Hyde and member of the Victorian League. This incarnation of Jekyll and Hyde reveals that eventually Jekyll found that he would transform into Hyde under stress, not unlike Hulk. Likewise, Hyde has become progressively taller and bulkier than Jekyll, while Jekyll has become shorter and withered. During a dinner scene, Hyde explains that this is because splitting himself and Jekyll into separate identities resulted in him losing his restraints and growing beyond his original limits, while Jekyll withered away without anything to drive him. During the Martian invasion, he developed a strong respect for Mina Murray and sacrificed himself to stop Martian tripods from crossing London Bridge. His self-sacrifice was honored in having Serpentine Park named into Hyde Park and a statue of Mr. Hyde is seen in the park in The League of Extraordinary Gentlemen: Black Dossier and throughout The League of Extraordinary Gentlemen, Volume III: Century.
 The Marvel Comics character Hulk is loosely based on Dr. Jekyll and Mr. Hyde and Frankenstein's Monster. The supervillain Mister Hyde is more directly inspired by Dr. Jekyll and Mr. Hyde.
 The DC Comics supervillain Two-Face was inspired by Dr. Jekyll and Mr. Hyde due to their split personality.
 Satanik, an Italian noir comic book created in December 1964: Marny Bannister, a female chemistry scientist whose face is marked by an angioma, develops a drug which transforms her into a fascinating woman. The drug has an unexpected side effect, making her a criminal mastermind.

Music
 The Who recorded the song "Dr. Jekyll and Mr. Hyde" on their album Magic Bus: The Who on Tour.
 Renaissance recorded the song "Jekyll and Hyde" on their album Azure d'Or.
 The Damned recorded a song titled "Dr. Jekyll and Mr. Hyde" on their 1980 release The Black Album.
 Dr. Jeckyll & Mr. Hyde was a 1980s hip hop group.
 The split personality theme - I am to myself what Jekyll must have been to Hyde - is featured in ABBA song "Me and I" (1980).
 Men at Work parodied the two names somewhat for their song, Dr. Heckyll & Mr. Jive in 1983.
 South Korean boy band VIXX released their first mini-album, Hyde, and first repackaged mini album, Jekyll, based on the novel.
 Heavy metal band Judas Priest released a song entitled "Jekyll and Hyde" on their 2001 album Demolition.
 Another heavy metal band, Iced Earth, released a song entitled "Jekyll & Hyde" on their 2001 album, Horror Show.
 American Christian Rock band Petra recorded a song "Jekyll & Hyde" for their 2003 album with the same name.
 American rock band Halestorm released an album in 2012 called The Strange Case Of..., with a track called "Mz. Hyde". The title of the album and song is referencing singer Lzzy Hale's on stage and off stage sides to her life.
 In 2010, Lara Fabian released a song "Mademoiselle Hyde" on her album Mademoiselle Zhivago, composed by Igor Krutoy. In 2019, the song was rearranged by Igor Krutoy and sung by Dimash Kudaibergen.
 In 2015, Five Finger Death Punch released a single named "Jekyll & Hyde".
 Ice Nine Kills released the single "Me, Myself & Hyde" in February 2015.
 Zac Brown Band released the album Jekyll + Hyde in 2015.
 In 2015, artist Jonathan Thulin released a single called "Jekyll & Hyde".
 In 2019, artist Bishop Briggs released the song "Jekyll & Hyde" as the third track to the album Champion.
 In 2019, K-pop group Exo released the song "Jekyll" in their sixth album Obsession.
 Devo referenced Dr. Jekyll and Mr. Hyde in the lyrics of their song "The Shadow" for their 1988 album Total Devo.
 in 2022, artist Red Leather referenced "Jekyll & Hyde" in his single "THE ONLY TIME IT RAINS IN HOLLYWOOD"

Stage
The story was adapted into a stage musical simply titled Jekyll & Hyde, with music by Frank Wildhorn and book by Leslie Bricusse. It premiered on May 24, 1990, at the Alley Theatre in Houston, Texas, with Chuck Wagner playing the title role(s) and Linda Eder as Lucy Harris. The stage version includes several character changes: Jekyll believes the evil in man is the reason for his father's mental deficiencies and is the driving force of his work; he is also engaged to Sir Danvers' daughter, Emma, while her former lover, Simon Stride, is still longing for her affections. The musical also features a prostitute named Lucy Harris, who is the object of Hyde's lust. Hyde also murders seven people in the musical: each member of the Board of Governors at the hospital where Jekyll is employed and rejected his work, along with Lucy and Stride. Robert Cuccioli originated the role(s) for the first U.S. tour in 1995, and then in the original Broadway theatre version in 1997. Other notable actors to play the role(s) include: Jack Wagner, Anthony Warlow, Sebastian Bach, David Hasselhoff, Rob Evan, and Constantine Maroulis in the 2013 revival.

Miscellaneous
 The Lego Minifigures theme has a character in Series 9 named Mr. Good and Evil, who is based on Dr. Jekyll and Mr. Hyde.
 In Monster High, there are characters named Jackson Jekyll and Holt Hyde who are the descendants of Dr. Jekyll. They are voiced by Cindy Robinson in the webisodes and TV specials.
 In Servamp, a manga written and illustrated by Strike Tanaka, there are two characters known as Licht Jekylland Todoroki and Lawless of Greed (later given the name of Hyde by the former). They have no direct correlation with Dr. Jekyll and Mr. Hyde in personality traits from the original novel, but their names, as well as their roles as opposites to each other (Licht as an Angel and Hyde as a Demon) nod to the original story. Their combined special attack is titled "Jekyll and Hyde".
 In Fate/Grand Order, a mobile video game based on the Fate/stay night visual novel and franchise from Type-Moon, a Servant under the classes Assassin and Berserker appears, named "Henry Jekyll & Hyde." In most of his appearance during battle sequences, he is the Assassin-class Servant Henry Jekyll, however when using his Noble Phantasm, or special ability, he becomes the Berserker-class Servant Hyde.
 In the BBC radio sketch show John Finnemore's Souvenir Programme, one sketch depicts the relationship between Dr. Jekyll and Mr. Hyde (played by John Finnemore and Simon Kane respectively) as that of aggrieved flatmates. They enter into a tit-for-tat exchange which ends in begrudging compromise after Jekyll threatens to get a vasectomy.

References

America's Best Comics characters
Literary characters introduced in 1886
Jekyll, Henry
Jekyll, Henry
Fictional characters with dissociative identity disorder
Fictional English people
Male horror film villains
Characters in British novels of the 19th century
Fictional murderers
Fictional serial killers
Experimental medical treatments in fiction
Literary duos
Male characters in literature
Fictional characters with alter egos
Male literary villains
Fictional monsters
Strange Case of Dr Jekyll and Mr Hyde